Cloud rap is a subgenre of rap that has several sonic characteristics of trap music and lo-fi in its hazy, dreamlike and relaxed sound. Many music experts credit rapper Lil B and producer Clams Casino as the early pioneers of this style. The term "cloud rap" is related to its internet birth and its ethereal style.

Origins 
Cloud rap initially came out of Atlanta, Houston, and Memphis during the late 2000s. The term "cloud rap" is popularly used in reference to lo-fi, hazy rap.

Elements of cloud rap, like lo-fi and dreamy atmospheres, can be heard as early as 2001 with cLOUDDEAD's self-titled album. Later in 2006 more building blocks, such as hazy and relaxed sounds, can be found in Viper's second album, Ready...and Willing. Some have attributed the term to rapper Lil B. In a 2009 article, music writer Noz wrote that rapper Lil B showed him a CGI image of a castle in the clouds and said "that's the kind of music I want to make," crediting Lil B with the coining of the term. Producer Clams Casino has also been credited with pioneering the cloud rap sound as early as 2010 through collaborations with Lil B.

The term was also used in the Space Age Hustle blog's compilation of songs, 3 Years Ahead: The Cloud Rap Tape. The compilation consists of songs that fall in the cloud rap genre. The genre garnered mainstream attention in 2011 with rapper A$AP Rocky's debut mixtape, Live. Love. A$AP.

Characteristics 
Cloud rap is rhythmically similar to lo-fi and chill-wave but distinguishes itself with distorted, psychedelic samples and the inclusion of rap. The genre takes inspiration from the "diversity of influences and the easy accessibility" that cloud computing entails. Such influences include hip hop, drum and bass, grime, and trip hop, R&B, dance, indie, rock, and pop music genres.

The label "cloud" denotes distinct characteristics of the genre such as its "hazy," ethereal aesthetic (in terms of both aural and visual expression) and its ambiguity as a genre without clearly defined borders. Cloud rap's lyrics sometimes revolve around themes of love and betrayal, as well as more typical themes found in popular music such as sex, drugs, and alienation. Frequently vocalists use nonsensical catchphrases and Twitter baits, such as interjections like "swag," and references to being "based," which highlights a sense of self-aware absurdity as an attempt at parody while embracing its genesis in Internet culture.

Cloud rap pulls from a diversity of rap sounds and locales: from both the East and West Coasts and the South. In particular, cloud rap often utilizes looped samples from female singers, and often from those whose voices have an ethereal quality. Often, cloud rap is released independently of record labels, and cloud rap artists rely on internet services (such as SoundCloud, YouTube, and Twitter) to distribute and promote their music.

It is also often mixed with Emo Rap, with an example being Oliver Francis's EP, If You Need A Friend

Artists and producers 
Clams Casino produced three songs on Lil B's 2009 mixtape 6 Kiss. In 2011, Clams Casino assisted A$AP Rocky in producing Live. Love. A$AP, one of the most listened to mixtapes in cloud rap with 1,164,114 listeners. The mixtape consists of common cloud rap elements and themes such as drug use, sex, and self-reflection.

Like Clams Casino, Imogen Heap entered this genre in 2009, with her music being sampled by Clams Casino on Lil B's song "I'm God". Heap has since been sampled repeatedly by Lil B. Heap further cemented herself in the cloud rap genre by being featured on Live. Love. A$AP in 2011.

Swedish artist Yung Lean became an eminent cloud rap artist in 2013 when the video for his single "Ginseng Strip 2002" went viral.

Houston based rapper Viper is often credited as being an early pioneer of cloud rap. Most of his songs contain simple self produced beats using a Yamaha Motif or FL Studio. His most popular album, 2008's You'll Cowards Don't Even Smoke Crack, contains lo-fi style beats that sound similar to many modern cloud rap songs.

See also

 Lo-fi hip hop

References 

2000s in music
2010s in music
2010s fads and trends
American styles of music
Hip hop genres
Lo-fi music
Microgenres